Goomally is a rural locality in the Central Highlands Region, Queensland, Australia.

Road infrastructure
The Fitzroy Developmental Road follows part of the eastern boundary and then runs through the north-eastern extremity.

References 

Central Highlands Region
Localities in Queensland